The North Dakota Fighting Sioux women's ice hockey team represents the University of North Dakota in the WCHA women's ice hockey conference. The team will attempt to qualify for the NCAA Frozen Four for the first time.

Offseason

Recruiting

Exhibition
September 24: Freshman Josefine Jakobsen recorded a hat-trick as the Fighting Sioux defeated the Manitoba Bisons women's ice hockey program by a 10-0 tally. Of note, the European skaters combined for 11 points in the game. Michelle Karvinen had four points, while freshman Andrea Dalen had three points.

Regular season
October 15–16: Michelle Karvinen produced five points, and earned a +5 plus/minus rating as the Fighting Sioux swept the Vermont Catamounts. In a 9-1 win on October 15, 2011, Karvinen scored two goals and set up another for a three-point performance. She assisted on Jocelyne Lamoureux’s game-winning goal at 2:58 of the first period. The following day, she accumulated two more assists in a 4-1 triumph. For the second consecutive game, she assisted on the game-winning goal, as Monique Lamoureux scored at 15:11 of the second period.
October 21: In its WCHA home opener, the top line of the Fighting Sioux combined for thirteen points as they bested the Ohio State Buckeyes by an 11-1 margin. Monique Lamoureux-Kolls tied a North Dakota record with a 5-point game. In the contest, 13 different Sioux skaters registered at least one point. Michelle Karvinen scored a hat trick and logged one assist for four points. In addition, Josefine Jakobsen and Jocelyne Lamoureux each had 4-point games. Several program records were broken in the game including: most goals scored in a game (11), largest margin of victory (10), and largest margin of victory over a conference opponent (10).

Jocelyne Lamoureux
As a 2012 Patty Kazmaier Award finalist, Lamoureux was the NCAA scoring champion with 82 points. She also led the NCAA in two other statistical categories: points per game (2.34) and assists (48). All three benchmarks are new Fighting Sioux records. In WCHA conference play, Lamoureux led all skaters in points (64), goals (27) and assists (37). Lamoureux was named to the 2012 All-WCHA First Team, while also being recognized as the WCHA Student-Athlete of the Year Award winner. In addition to being recognized as an American Hockey Coaches Association (AHCA) All-American First Teamselection, she was also named to the 2012 Capital One Academic All-America Team. Lamoureux became North Dakota’s 75 Academic All-American, and the first ever from the women’s hockey program.

Standings

Schedule
 Green background indicates regulation or overtime win.
 Red background indicates regulation or overtime loss.
 White background indicates tie or overtime tie.

Notes:
(EX) Denotes an exhibition game

† Denotes a non-conference game

Awards and honors
Jorid Dagfinrud, WCHA Defensive Player of the Week (Week of January 23, 2012
Josefine Jakobsen, WCHA Defensive Player of the Week (Week of February 1, 2012)
Josefine Jakobsen, WCHA Rookie of the Week (Week of February 22, 2012)
Jocelyne Lamoureux, WCHA Player of the Week (Week of November 8, 2011)
Jocelyne Lamoureux, WCHA Player of the Week (Week of January 23, 2012)
Jocelyne Lamoureux, Finalist, 2012 Patty Kazmaier Memorial Award
Jocelyne Lamoureux, NCAA scoring champion
Jocelyne Lamoureux, WCHA scoring champion
Jocelyne Lamoureux, UND's 2011-12 Grace Rhonemus Female Athlete of the Year Award 
Jocelyne Lamoureux, 2012 Capital One Academic All-American 
Monique Lamoureux, WCHA Player of the Week (Week of October 25, 2011)
 Monique Lamoureux, WCHA Defensive Player of the Week (Week of February 8, 2012)
Michelle Karvinen, WCHA Rookie of the Week (Week of October 18, 2011)
Michelle Karvinen, WCHA Rookie of the Week (Week of October 25, 2011)
Michelle Karvinen, WCHA Rookie of the Week (Week of November 8, 2011)
Michelle Karvinen, WCHA Rookie of the Week (Week of February 8, 2012)
Candice Molle, WCHA Defensive Player of the Week (Week of November 21, 2011)

References

North Dakota
North Dakota Fighting Hawks women's ice hockey seasons
2011 in sports in North Dakota
2012 in sports in North Dakota